The 1992–93 season saw Rochdale compete in their 19th consecutive season in the fourth tier of the English football league. This season saw the formation of the Premier League and therefore the former Fourth Division became the Football League Third Division.

Statistics
																												
																												

|}

Final League Table

Competitions

Football League Third Division

F.A. Cup

Football League Cup (Coca Cola Cup)

Associate Members' Cup (Autoglass Trophy)

Lancashire Cup

References

Rochdale A.F.C. seasons
Rochdale